In trigonometry, the law of sines, sine law, sine formula, or sine rule is an equation relating the lengths of the sides of any triangle to the sines of its angles. According to the law,

When the last part of the equation is not used, the law is sometimes stated using the reciprocals;

The law of sines can be used to compute the remaining sides of a triangle when two angles and a side are known—a technique known as triangulation. It can also be used when two sides and one of the non-enclosed angles are known. In some such cases, the triangle is not uniquely determined by this data (called the ambiguous case) and the technique gives two possible values for the enclosed angle.

The law of sines is one of two trigonometric equations commonly applied to find lengths and angles in scalene triangles, with the other being the law of cosines.

The law of sines can be generalized to higher dimensions on surfaces with constant curvature.

History
According to Ubiratàn D'Ambrosio and Helaine Selin, the spherical law of sines was discovered in the 10th century. It is variously attributed to Abu-Mahmud Khojandi, Abu al-Wafa' Buzjani, Nasir al-Din al-Tusi and Abu Nasr Mansur.

Ibn Muʿādh al-Jayyānī's The book of unknown arcs of a sphere in the 11th century contains the general law of sines. The plane law of sines was later stated in the 13th century by Nasīr al-Dīn al-Tūsī. In his On the Sector Figure, he stated the law of sines for plane and spherical triangles, and provided proofs for this law.

According to Glen Van Brummelen, "The Law of Sines is really Regiomontanus's foundation for his solutions of right-angled triangles in Book IV, and these solutions are in turn the bases for his solutions of general triangles." Regiomontanus was a 15th-century German mathematician.

Proof
The area  of any triangle can be written as one half of its base times its height.  Selecting one side of the triangle as the base, the height of the triangle relative to that base is computed as the length of another side times the sine of the angle between the chosen side and the base.  Thus depending on the selection of the base, the area of the triangle can be written as any of:

Multiplying these by  gives

The ambiguous case of triangle solution
When using the law of sines to find a side of a triangle, an ambiguous case occurs when two separate triangles can be constructed from the data provided (i.e., there are two different possible solutions to the triangle).

Given a general triangle, the following conditions would need to be fulfilled for the case to be ambiguous:
 The angle  is acute (i.e.,  < 90°).
 The side  is shorter than the side  (i.e.).
 The side  is longer than the altitude  from angle , where  (i.e.).

If all the above conditions are true, then each of angles  and  produces a valid triangle, meaning that both of the following are true:

Examples
The following are examples of how to solve a problem using the law of sines.

Example 1

Given: side , side , and angle . Angle  is desired.

Using the law of sines, we conclude that

Note that the potential solution  is excluded because that would necessarily give .

Example 2

Relation to the circumcircle
In the identity

the common value of the three fractions is actually the diameter of the triangle's circumcircle. This result dates back to Ptolemy.

Proof 
Since  is a right triangle,

where  is the radius of the circumscribing circle of the triangle. Angles  and  have the same central angle thus they are the same: . Therefore,

Rearranging yields

Repeating the process of creating  with other points gives

Relationship to the area of the triangle 
Substituting the sine law into this equation gives

Taking  as the circumscribing radius,  

It can also be shown that this equality implies

The second equality above readily simplifies to Heron's formula for the area.

where  is the radius of the circumcircle: .

The spherical law of sines

The spherical law of sines deals with triangles on a sphere, whose sides are arcs of great circles.

Suppose the radius of the sphere is 1. These are dihedral angles between the planes of the three great circles.

Then the spherical law of sines says:

Vector proof 
Consider a unit sphere with three unit vectors ,  and  drawn from the origin to the vertices of the triangle. The arc  subtends an angle of magnitude  at the centre. Therefore, the three vectors have components:

With the -axis along  the square of this determinant is

Equating these expressions and dividing throughout by  gives 

where  is the volume of the parallelepiped formed by the position vector of the vertices of the spherical triangle. Consequently, the result follows.

It is easy to see how for small spherical triangles, when the radius of the sphere is much greater than the sides of the triangle, this formula becomes the planar formula at the limit, since

Geometric proof 
Consider a unit sphere with:

Construct point  and point  such that 

Construct point  such that 

It can therefore be seen that  and 

Therefore 

By basic trigonometry, we have:

But 

Combining them we have:

By applying similar reasoning, we obtain the spherical law of sine:

Other proofs 
A purely algebraic proof can be constructed from the spherical law of cosines.

Since the right hand side is invariant under a cyclic permutation of  the spherical sine rule follows immediately.

The figure used in the Geometric proof above is used by and also provided in Banerjee (see Figure 3 in this paper) to derive the sine law using elementary linear algebra and projection matrices.

Hyperbolic case
In hyperbolic geometry when the curvature is −1, the law of sines becomes

In the special case when  is a right angle, one gets

which is the analog of the formula in Euclidean geometry expressing the sine of an angle as the opposite side divided by the hypotenuse.

The case of surfaces of constant curvature 

Define a generalized sine function, depending also on a real parameter :

The law of sines in constant curvature  reads as

Let  indicate the circumference of a circle of radius  in a space of constant curvature . Then . Therefore, the law of sines can also be expressed as:

This formulation was discovered by János Bolyai.

Higher dimensions
For an -dimensional simplex (i.e., triangle, tetrahedron, pentatope, etc.) in -dimensional Euclidean space, the absolute value of the polar sine of the normal vectors of the facets that meet at a vertex, divided by the hyperarea of the facet opposite the vertex is independent of the choice of the vertex.

For example, a tetrahedron has four triangular facets.  The absolute value of the polar sine of the normal vectors to the three facets that share a vertex, divided by the area of the fourth facet will not depend upon the choice of the vertex:

See also
 Gersonides
 Half-side formula for solving spherical triangles
 Law of cosines
 Law of tangents
 Law of cotangents
 Mollweide's formula for checking solutions of triangles
 Solution of triangles
 Surveying

References

External links

 
 The Law of Sines at cut-the-knot
 Degree of Curvature
 Finding the Sine of 1 Degree
 Generalized law of sines to higher dimensions

Trigonometry
Angle
Articles containing proofs
Theorems about triangles